Euriphene conjungens, the androconial nymph, is a butterfly in the family Nymphalidae. It is found in Cameroon, the Democratic Republic of the Congo, Uganda and Tanzania. The habitat consists of forests.

Subspecies
Euriphene conjungens conjungens (Cameroon)
Euriphene conjungens chalybeata (Talbot, 1937) (Democratic Republic of the Congo: Sankuru, Uganda: western shore of Lake Victoria)
Euriphene conjungens kiellandi Hecq, 1994 (north-western Tanzania)

References

Butterflies described in 1909
Euriphene